Francis McLaren (1881 – 1961) was a Scottish footballer who played as a right half or centre half. He spent the bulk of his professional career with Heart of Midlothian where he was a regular for seven years, winning the Scottish Cup in 1906 and also appearing on the losing side in the 1907 final. He also had two years with Hamilton Academical, acting as mentor to younger players such as William McNamee.

References

1881 births
Date of birth unknown
1961 deaths
Date of death unknown
Footballers from Coatbridge
Scottish footballers
Heart of Midlothian F.C. players
Hamilton Academical F.C. players
Scottish Junior Football Association players
Scottish Football League players
Association football wing halves
Association football central defenders
People from Kilsyth